The 1928 Louisville Cardinals football team was an American football team that represented the University of Louisville as member of the Southern Intercollegiate Athletic Association (SIAA) during the 1928 college football season. In their fourth season under head coach Tom King, the Cardinals compiled a 1–7 record.

Schedule

References

Louisville
Louisville Cardinals football seasons
Louisville Cardinals football